Baron Ferdinand Moritz Delmar born Salomon Moses Levy (21 March 1781 – 27 November 1858) was a wealthy Prussian banker. He also owned coffee and tea plantations in Sri Lanka (Ceylon) including the namesake Delmar Estate.

Salomon Moses Levy was born in Charlottenburg, Berlin to a Jewish family that came from Poznan. His father was Moses Salomon Levy, also a banker and grain merchant and his mother Belle was the daughter of the court banker Ruben Hesse Goldschmidt in Kassel. Delmar was also a banker and financier involved in the Prussian war tributes after the Treaties of Tilsit. He inherited Delmar and Co in 1809 and along with his brothers, he adopted the name of "Delmar" (meaning "of the sea") and converted to Christianity. He then became a councilor for Berlin and was a friend of the French aristocracy there. In 1810 he received the Prussian title of Freiherr (baron) von Delmar. He moved around 1815 to Paris where he married Emily (1790-1861), the daughter of Sir George Rumbold, 2nd Baronet (1764-1807). Delmar adopted his wife's niece Emily Victorine Elizabeth Rumbold, created Freifrau von Delmar in 1869 (1824-1904, daughter of Sir William Rumbold, 3rd Baronet), who married in 1848 (div 1866) George Henry Cavendish (1824-1889, grandson of George Cavendish, 1st Earl of Burlington), then in 1870 to Count Gaston de la Rochefoucauld (1834-1915). The Delmar company went out of business in 1825. Baron Delmar's estates in Ceylon were mortgaged to Baring Brothers and in 1897 the Ceylon lands were liquidated after a complicated court settlement between his adopted daughter Emily and coffee plantation owner John Boustead who had taken possession of the estates.

References

German bankers
1781 births
1858 deaths
German people of Jewish descent
Converts to Christianity from Judaism